Clint Kent (born October 14, 1983) is an American gridiron football coach and former player.  He is an assistant football coach at Lyon College in Batesville, Arkansas.  Kent played professionally in the Canadian Football League as a defensive back. He played college football at James Madison University. He also played professionally in Finland.

References

External links
 Lyon Scots bio
 Edmonton Eskimos bio

1983 births
Living people
American football defensive backs
Canadian football defensive backs
Edmonton Elks players
James Madison Dukes football players
Lyon Scots football coaches
Montreal Alouettes players
Winnipeg Blue Bombers players
High school football coaches in Georgia (U.S. state)
Sportspeople from Macon, Georgia
African-American coaches of American football
African-American players of American football
African-American players of Canadian football
21st-century African-American sportspeople
20th-century African-American people